The 2020 Season Finale 500 was a NASCAR Cup Series race held on November 8, 2020 at Phoenix Raceway in Avondale, Arizona. Contested over 312 laps on the one mile (1.6 km) oval, it was the 36th and final race of the 2020 NASCAR Cup Series season.

The Season Finale 500 was the final start for seven-time champion Jimmie Johnson, 2012 Cup runner-up Clint Bowyer, and 2003 Winston Cup champion Matt Kenseth as full-time Cup Series drivers.

Report

Background

Phoenix Raceway – also known as PIR – is a one-mile, low-banked tri-oval race track located in Avondale, Arizona. It is named after the nearby metropolitan area of Phoenix. The motorsport track opened in 1964 and currently hosts two NASCAR race weekends annually. PIR has also hosted the IndyCar Series, CART, USAC and the Rolex Sports Car Series. The raceway is currently owned and operated by International Speedway Corporation.

The raceway was originally constructed with a  road course that ran both inside and outside of the main tri-oval. In 1991 the track was reconfigured with the current  interior layout. PIR has an estimated grandstand seating capacity of around 67,000. Lights were installed around the track in 2004 following the addition of a second annual NASCAR race weekend.

Phoenix Raceway is home to two annual NASCAR race weekends, one of 13 facilities on the NASCAR schedule to host more than one race weekend a year. The track is both the first and last stop in the western United States, as well as the fourth and the last track on the schedule.

This was the first time the championship race was held in Phoenix.

Championship drivers
Joey Logano was the first of the four drivers to clinch a spot in the Championship 4, winning the first race of the Round of 8 at Kansas.

Chase Elliott clinched the second spot in the Championship 4, winning the final race of the Round of 8 at Martinsville.

Brad Keselowski clinched the third spot in the Championship 4 based on points.

Denny Hamlin clinched the final spot in the Championship 4 based on points.

Entry list
 (R) denotes rookie driver.
 (i) denotes driver who are ineligible for series driver points.
 (CC) denotes championship contender

Qualifying
Chase Elliott was awarded the pole for the race as determined by competition-based formula. However he was sent to the rear of the field as a result of failing pre-race inspection multiple times.

Starting Lineup

Race

Note: Chase Elliott, Brad Keselowski, Joey Logano, and Denny Hamlin are not eligible for stage points because of their participation in the Championship 4.

Stage Results

Stage One
Laps: 75

Stage Two
Laps: 115

Final Stage Results

Stage Three
Laps: 122

Race statistics
 Lead changes: 19 among 9 different drivers
 Cautions/Laps: 4 for 27
 Red flags: 0
 Time of race: 2 hours, 47 minutes and 0 seconds
 Average speed:

Media

Television
NBC Sports covered the race on the television side. Rick Allen, two–time Phoenix winner Jeff Burton, Steve Letarte and three-time Phoenix winner Dale Earnhardt Jr. called the action from the booth. Dave Burns, Parker Kligerman, Marty Snider and Kelli Stavast handled the pit road duties, and At Homie Rutledge Wood handled the features from his home during the race.

Radio
MRN covered the radio call for the race, which was simulcast on Sirius XM NASCAR Radio. Alex Hayden, Jeff Striegle and Rusty Wallace called the action from the broadcast booth when the field raced down the front straightaway. Dave Moody called the action from turns 1 & 2 and Mike Bagley called the action from turns 3 & 4. Winston Kelley and Steve Post covered the action for MRN from pit lane.

Standings after the race

Drivers' Championship standings

Manufacturers' Championship standings

Note: Only the first 16 positions are included for the driver standings.

References

2020 in sports in Arizona
Season Finale 500
NASCAR races at Phoenix Raceway
Season Finale 500